Jörg Stollman is a German architect, currently the Chair for Urban Design & Architecture at TU Berlin's Institut für Architektur. He is the cofounder of UrbanInform.net.

Work 
His most recent work is the restoration of Santozeum, the original site for which was designed by the renowned Greek architect Constantinos Decavallas.

References

External links 
 Faculty page

Living people
Year of birth missing (living people)
Princeton University alumni
21st-century German architects
Place of birth missing (living people)